These Rooms is an album by guitarist Jim Hall recorded in 1988 and released on the Japanese Denon label.

Reception

AllMusic awarded the album 4 stars, with the review by Ken Dryden   stating, "This 1988 studio date is one of the overlooked treasures in the considerable discography of Jim Hall ... a delight from start to finish".

Track listing
All compositions by Jim Hall except where noted
 "With a Song in My Heart" (Richard Rodgers, Lorenz Hart) – 8:22
 "Cross Court" – 5:11
 "Something Tells Me" – 5:10
 "Bimini" – 9:19
 "All Too Soon" (Duke Ellington, Carl Sigman) – 4:00
 "These Rooms" – 11:25
 "Darn That Dream" (Jimmy Van Heusen, Eddie DeLange) – 4:03
 "My Funny Valentine" (Rodgers, Hart) – 6:22
 "Where or When" (Rodgers, Hart) – 5:49
 "From Now On" (Tom Harrell) – 7:04

Personnel
Jim Hall – guitar
Tom Harrell – trumpet, flugelhorn
Steve LaSpina – bass
Joey Baron – drums

References 

1988 albums
Jim Hall (musician) albums
Denon Records albums